Enter the Dangerous Mind, also known under its original title of Snap, is a 2013 psychological thriller film that was directed by Youssef Delara and Victor Teran. The film had its world premiere on 11 March 2013 at the South by Southwest Film Festival and had its theatrical release on 6 February 2015. Enter the Dangerous Mind stars Jake Hoffman as an EDM musician that falls into madness after his relationship with a beautiful woman (Nikki Reed) turns sour.

Teran and Delara have cited the movies Taxi Driver and The Shining as influences for Enter the Dangerous Mind and filming took place over a 25-day period.

Synopsis

In his spare time Jim (Jake Hoffman) makes his own dubstep mixes, as he sees them as an outlet to express himself in ways that he is otherwise incapable of achieving. He's constantly harangued by his roommate Jake (Thomas Dekker), who views Jim as a loser and wants him to do more than just hang around the apartment all day. It's through his work at a women's shelter that he meets Wendy (Nikki Reed) and the two initially begin to form a connection as they both share a love of dubstep and because Wendy recognizes that they share a lot of the same issues in life. This  relationship proves to be short lived after Jim prematurely ejaculates during a date. Jake is sure that Wendy will only spread the story around and ruin Jim's life by holding him up as an object of ridicule. With few other options Jim begins to take more and more of Jake's advice, which sets him on a far darker path than he could have expected.

Cast
Jake Hoffman as Jim Whitman
Nikki Reed as Wendy
Scott Bakula as Kevin
Gina Rodriguez as Adrienne
Thomas Dekker as Jake
Jason Priestley as Dr. Dubrow
Noel Gugliemi as Detective Salinas
Joe Egender as Steve
Skyler Brigmann as Young Jim
Joseph Julian Soria as College Student
Melanie Hawkins as Deborah
William Leon as Young Boy
Jenn Liu as Amy
Jessica Tyler Brown as Cate
Ana Claudia Talancon

Reception

Critical reception for Enter the Dangerous Mind has been negative, holding a 23% rating on Rotten Tomatoes based on 13 reviews with an average score of 3.3/10.

However, Screen Daily and Film School Rejects both praised the movie, and both outlets praised the film for its characterizations and soundtrack.

References

External links
 

2013 films
American psychological horror films
2013 psychological thriller films
2010s English-language films
2010s American films